Zachary Miskom Tom (born March 26, 1999) is an American football guard for the Green Bay Packers of the National Football League (NFL). He played college football at Wake Forest and was drafted by the Packers in the fourth round of the 2022 NFL Draft.

Early life and high school career
Tom was born in Baton Rouge, Louisiana grew up in Prairieville, Louisiana, and attended Catholic High School in Baton Rouge, Louisiana.

College career
Tom was a member of the Wake Forest Demon Deacons for five seasons and redshirted his true freshman season. He became the team's starting center going into his redshirt sophomore season and was named honorable mention All-Atlantic Coast Conference (ACC) after starting all 13 of Wake Forest's games. Tom moved to left tackle the following season and started nine games. He was named first-team All-ACC in 2021.

Professional career

Tom was drafted by the Green Bay Packers in the fourth round (140th overall) of the 2022 NFL Draft. He signed his four-year rookie contract on May 26, 2022. He saw his first NFL action on September 11, 2022 during a Week 1 loss to the Minnesota Vikings, filling in at left guard after starter Jon Runyan Jr. suffered a concussion in the third quarter.

References

External links
Green Bay Packers bio
Wake Forest Demon Deacons bio

Living people
American football offensive tackles
Wake Forest Demon Deacons football players
Green Bay Packers players
1999 births
People from Prairieville, Louisiana
Players of American football from Louisiana